Home Is in Your Head is the second studio album by His Name Is Alive, originally released via 4AD in the UK on September 9, 1991, and on Rykodisc in the United States in 1992.

History
Like their 4AD debut, Livonia, His Name Is Alive's Home Is in Your Head comprises tracks that originated in Warren Defever's basement on a 4-track recorder, later remixed by Ivo Watts-Russell and John Fryer into something suitable for release.

"Sitting Still Moving Still Staring Outlooking" was later used in the 1996 film Jerry Maguire in a key scene when Tom Cruise is having a nervous breakdown.

Release Details
"There's Something Between Us and He's Changing My Words" is a cover of a song by Bone Machine, which consisted of Defever, guitarist Jymn Auge and drummer Scott "Scoot" Mackenzie, and released their sole album in 1989. Auge had guested on Livonia, and, by this album, he was a full-time member of HNIA. "Man on the Silver Mountain" is a cover of a song by Rainbow.

A hidden song is included on the last track. After a brief moment of silence following the conclusion of "Dreams Are of the Body," a song called "The Other Body" begins. This is a demo track that ends abruptly, as the tape ran out during recording.

The album was only available in the United States as an import until 1992, when Rykodisc issued the album domestically on CD. The Rykodisc release, which is now out of print, also contained The Dirt Eaters EP, which had been released in the UK in early 1992. When 4AD reissued the album on CD in 1998, they also included these tracks. The Rykodisc version featured a different album cover, which was a slightly re-worked version of the back cover of the 4AD release.

Track listing
All songs written by His Name Is Alive, unless noted.

Personnel

Musicians
Karin Oliver - Vocals, guitar, songs
Warren Defever - Guitar, bass, samples, songs, pencil guitar
Melissa Elliott - Guitar, pencil guitar, songs
Jymn Auge - Guitar, song
Damian Lang - Drums, rainmaker, crashers, bone
Denise James - Vocals, song
Karen Neal - Vocals on "Is This the Way the Tigers Do?"

Production
Ivo Watts-Russell and John Fryer – Mixing (at Blackwing Studios)
Gus Shaw - Digital compilation, mastering
Vaughan Oliver/v23 – Art direction and design
Dominic Davies - Photography

Release history

References

1991 albums
His Name Is Alive albums
4AD albums
Albums produced by John Fryer (producer)